Wayne P. Anderson  is a retired Professor Emeritus of Psychology at University of Missouri in Columbia, Missouri. He taught at Missouri for 32 years beginning in 1963.  After his retirement in 1995, he continued to teach for several years a summer course on human sexuality for undergraduates. He is an instructor in the Osher Lifelong Learning Center, a correspondent and travel newspaper columnist, and author of more than a dozen books.

Anderson's international experience began in 1972 with a Master's Level visiting professorship for the U.S. Air Force Education System in Germany, Holland, England, Italy, and Spain. In 1989 Anderson was part of the University of Missouri Abroad program and taught one semester in London, England.

Anderson was also Adjunct Professor at Columbia College's Criminal Justice Program where he taught a master's level course in Crisis management.

During the 1990s and into the early 2000s, Anderson was a team member of the International Center for Psychosocial Trauma and has worked in Palestine, Bosnia, and Earthquake zones training teachers, physicians and mental health workers.

Early life 
A child of immigrant Swedes, Anderson grew up in Jamestown, North Dakota. He graduated in 1947 after attending a number of high schools. In 1952 Anderson enrolled in Jamestown College. He began graduate studies in 1952 in Jamestown at the University of North Dakota, then transferred to the University of Missouri – Columbia.

Personal life 
Wayne Anderson married Carla Lee Erickson November 22, 1952 after beginning graduate studies in Jamestown.

Awards and honors 
Winner of the Purple Chalk Award for undergraduate teaching and the Gold Chalk Award for graduate teaching in 1990 at the University of Missouri – Columbia. 
Awarded the first William T. Kemper Fellow for Excellence in Teaching, 1991, University of Missouri, Columbia, Missouri.
Anderson was the nominee of University of Missouri-Columbia campus for the 1993 and 1994 competition for the University system's award for outstanding teaching.
Inducted into the Jamestown College Alumni Hall of Fame, Educator and Humanitarian, 29 September 2000, Jamestown, North Dakota. 
2009 Humanitarian Award, Advisory Board of the University of Missouri International Center for Psychosocial Trauma in recognition of lifetime work to improving the lives of people including Children worldwide, 1 October 2009.

Books 
Stress Management for Law Enforcement Officers, Anderson, Wayne; Swenson, David & Clay, Daniel, (1995) Prentice Hall
Bulimia: Book for Therapist and Client, Barbara G Bauer, Wayne P Anderson, Robert H. Hyatt, Accelerated Development Inc. 1986X
Travels Into Our Past: America's Living History Museums & Historical Sites, AKA-Publishing, 2013
Our Swedish Roots: Stories about our Mostly Above Average Ancestors, AKA-Publishing, 2013
Offbeat Travel: Exploring the unexpected & mysterious, AKA-Publishing, 2014
Georgia and Alabama: Memorable Sites to Explore, AKA-Publishing, 2015
Dear Jeril... Love, Dad, AKA-Publishing, 2015
Exploring the Striking Contrasts of India, AKA-Publishing, 2015
Christina's Saga: From Norway to Dakota Territory, AKA-Publishing, 2010, 2016
Unforgettable World Wonders, AKA-Publishing, 2016
Travels Into Our Past: Volume Two: America's Living History Museums & Historical Sites, AKA-Publishing, 2017
Native Americans: Cultures Past and Present, AKA-Publishing, 2018
The Changing Face of Sex, AKA-Publishing, 2013

References 

Living people
American writers
People from Columbia, Missouri
University of Missouri alumni
University of Missouri faculty
Columbia College (Missouri) faculty
Year of birth missing (living people)